Rugby Pack is a French rugby programme for beIN Sports.

References

External links
Rugby Pack 

2013 French television series debuts
2010s French television series
Rugby union on television
Rugby league television shows
French sports television series